The National Police Academy (NPA) is the National Institute for training of the Police Service of Pakistan (PSP) officers who have been selected through the Central Superior Services examination. The trained officers on passing out hold the rank of ASP (Assistant Superintendents of Police). The academy is located in Islamabad.

In 1978, Government of Pakistan took first steps towards the establishment of National Police Academy. A training facility was established at Soan Camp on the outskirts of Rawalpindi with offices in rented premises in Islamabad. Though an improvement on the previous arrangements at Police College Sihala, this arrangement also lacked important facilities which are essential for Police Training. National Police Academy was dependent upon Police College Sihala for provision of riding, firing and obstacles facilities. In addition, the distance between training and administrative wings also contributed to ineffective supervision of training activities.

Initially, ASPs were trained in Basic Courses which subsequently replaced with Initial Command Course (ICC) after 1998.

Initial Command Course (ICC) is Specialized Training Programme (STP) designed for the new entrants of Police Service of Pakistan (PSP) officers which is spread over 18 months. This training consists upon four different phases 1) Foundation; 2) Development; 3) Field Attachment & 4) Consolidation.

Organization

The Academy is headed by a commandant, a PSP officer of the rank of Inspector General of Police or Additional Inspector General of Police and assisted by a Deputy Commandant of the rank of Deputy Inspector General of Police. The Course Commander, who is an officer of the rank of Senior Superintendent of Police is in charge of the training of the Assistant Superintendents of Police. Director senior Command Course looks after the training of DPOs.

External links

 National Police Academy,Pakistan
 National Police Bureau
 Balochistan Police
 Sindh Police
 KP Police
 Punjab Police
 AJK Police
 National Highway and Motorway Police
 https://www.fc.gov.pk/ Frontier Constabulary (FC)]
 PSP Association

References
 http://www.google.com.pk/search?hl=en&q=Police+Service+Pakistan&meta=&aq=f&oq=
 http://www.csspk.com/Police_Service_of_Pakistan.htm
 http://www.nrb.gov.pk/publications/police_ordinance.pdf
 https://web.archive.org/web/20170726011345/http://www.pspassociation.org/

1978 establishments in Pakistan
Police academies in Pakistan